Kibirige is a surname. Notable people with the surname include:

 Bulaimu Muwanga Kibirige (1953–2021), Ugandan businessman
 Zach Kibirige (born 1994), English rugby union player